H. Woodrow Fish is an American college administrator and former American football player and coach. He currently serves as the Assistant Vice-President of Development for Athletics at Gardner–Webb University in Boiling Springs, North Carolina. Fish was the head football coach at Gardner–Webb from 1984 to 1996, compiling a record of 72–71–1.

Head coaching record

College

References

Year of birth missing (living people)
Living people
American football linebackers
Duke Blue Devils football coaches
Gardner–Webb Runnin' Bulldogs football coaches
Gardner–Webb Runnin' Bulldogs football players
High school football coaches in North Carolina